Arnaud Desplechin (born 31 October 1960) is a French film director and screenwriter. In 2016, he won the César Award for Best Director for My Golden Days (2015).

Life and career
Desplechin was born in Roubaix. He is the son of Robert and Mado Desplechin, and grew up in the Nord department. He has a brother named Fabrice who has acted in several of his films, and two sisters: novelist Marie Desplechin and screenwriter Raphaëlle Desplechin.

Arnaud Desplechin studied film directing at the University of Paris III: Sorbonne Nouvelle then at the IDHEC, graduating in 1984. He made three short films inspired by the work of the Belgian novelist Jean Ray. During the late 1980s, Desplechin worked as a director of photography on several films.

In 1990, Desplechin directed La vie des morts, starring several actors who would go on to appear in multiple Desplechin films, such as Marianne Dénicourt, Emmanuelle Devos, Emmanuel Salinger and Thibault de Montalembert. The 54-minute-long film won the Jean Vigo Prize for Short Films, and was shown at the 1990 Cannes Film Festival.

Desplechin's first feature-length movie, The Sentinel, premiered in 1992 at Cannes, starring several actors from La vie des morts as well as Mathieu Amalric, Chiara Mastroianni, and Lászlo Szabó, who have also become frequent Desplechin collaborators. Desplechin's 1996 film My Sex Life... or How I Got Into an Argument was critically successful.

In 2000, Desplechin made his first English-language film, Esther Kahn, adapted from a short story by Arthur Symons, and starred Summer Phoenix in the title role. The film was seen as a homage to François Truffaut's work because it deals with coming of age (a favorite Truffaut theme) and uses the New Wave cinema techniques that Truffaut pioneered.

Three years later, Desplechin made two films adapting Edward Bond's play Playing 'In the Company of Men': one showing 70% rehearsal footage and 30% of the film itself; and the other with inverse proportions. The next year, he directed Kings and Queen, which mixed comedy and tragedy to tell the story of two ex-lovers played by Amalric and Devos. The film also starred Catherine Deneuve in the role of a psychiatrist. Kings and Queen was nominated for several awards and Amalric won the César Award for Best Actor. However, controversy arose when actress Marianne Denicourt, Desplechin's ex-girlfriend, accused him of revealing elements of her private life in the screenplay of Kings and Queen. In 2005, she published Mauvais génie ("Evil Genius"), describing her relationship with an unscrupulous film director called "Arnold Duplancher." In 2006, she unsuccessfully sued Desplechin.

In 2007, Desplechin filmed L'Aimée, a documentary showing his father, his brother, and his nephews in the family house in Roubaix just before it was to be sold. That same year, he filmed the family drama A Christmas Tale, starring Deneuve, Amalric, Devos, and Mastroianni. This film was screened in competition at Cannes in 2008.

His 2013 film Jimmy Picard was nominated for the Palme d'Or at the 2013 Cannes Film Festival constituting his fifth film selected in the main competition. In 2014, he adapted Alexander Ostrovsky's play The Forest.

For the drama film My Golden Days (2015), which he directed and co-wrote, Desplechin won the César Award and Lumières Award for best director, and the SACD Prize at the 2015 Cannes Film Festival.

In 2016, he was a member of the main competition jury of the 2016 Cannes Film Festival.

In 2019 film Oh Mercy! was nominated for the Palme d'Or at the 2019 Cannes Film Festival constituting his seventh film selected in the main competition.

Filmography
 La vie des morts (1991)
 La Sentinelle (1992)
 My Sex Life... or How I Got into an Argument (Comment je me suis disputé... (ma vie sexuelle)) (1996)
 Esther Kahn (2000)
 En jouant 'Dans la compagnie des hommes' (2003)
 Kings and Queen (Rois et Reine) (2004)
 L'Aimée (2007)
 A Christmas Tale (Un conte de Noël) (2008)
 Jimmy P: Psychotherapy of a Plains Indian (2013)
 La forêt (2014)
 My Golden Days (Trois souvenirs de ma jeunesse) (2015)
 Ismael's Ghosts (Les Fantômes d'Ismaël) (2017)
 Oh Mercy! (Roubaix, une lumière) (2019)
 Deception (2021)
 Brother and Sister (Frère et Sœur) (2022)

References

External links

Soul Searching - Interview with Desplechin on Esther Kahn
My Sex Life... How I Got Into An Argument at The Auteurs
Ryland Walker Knight on "My Sex Life..." and "Kings and Queen" at The House Next Door

1960 births
Living people
People from Roubaix
French film directors
French male screenwriters
French screenwriters
French cinematographers
French film producers
Best Director César Award winners
Best Director Lumières Award winners
French-language film directors
Sorbonne Nouvelle University Paris 3 alumni